It is not known when postal orders began to be issued in Brunei.

Bruneian-issued Malaysian postal orders

Malaysian postal orders were issued in Brunei as late as 1988, but it is not known when these issues began nor when they ended. Extant examples issued at the post office in Bandar Seri Begawan have been confirmed.

Bruneian-issued British postal orders

British postal orders are issued in the local post offices. It is not known when this practice started.

British Forces Post Office issues

As Brunei is a fully independent Commonwealth member state, postal orders are issued at the BFPO in Seria.

Currencies of Brunei
Brunei
Postal system of Brunei